St. John’s Church, Midnapore is a church made by the Church Mission Society of England. It was built in 1851 at Sekpura in Midnapore, Paschim Medinipur district in the Indian state of West Bengal. There are several notable graves inside the church cemetery. It is under the Diocese of Durgapur, C. N. I.

Graves
 Bernard Edward John Burge
 James Peddie
 Robert Douglas
 Lucie Mavourneen
 Amala

External links

References

Churches in West Bengal
1851 establishments in British India
Churches completed in 1851
Tourist attractions in Paschim Medinipur district